The Glockner Group is a sub-group of the Austrian Central Alps in the Eastern Alps, and is located in the centre section of the High Tauern on the main chain of the Alps.

The Glockner Group lies in Austria in the federal states of Salzburg, Tyrol and Carinthia. The three states meet at a tripoint on the summit of the Eiskögele.

The highest summit of the Glockner Group and also the highest peak in Austria is the Großglockner, which gives the mountain group its name. Considerable portions of the Glockner Group belong to the core zone of the High Tauern National Park. Also found in the Glockner Group is the Pasterze, the largest glacier in Austria.

Boundaries 
The boundaries of the Glockner Group are defined as follows: the River Salzach from Uttendorf to Taxenbach; the Rauriser Tal to Wörth; Seidlwinkltal; Hochtor (Großglockner High Alpine Road); Tauernbach; Möll to its confluence with the Moosbach; Moosbach; Peischlachtörl; Peischlachbach; Kals am Großglockner; Kalser Bach; Dorfertal; Dorfersee; Kalser Tauern; Weißsee; Weißenbach; Grünsee; Enzingerboden; Stubachtal; Uttendorf.

Together with the Ankogel Group, the Goldberg Group, the Schober Group, the Kreuzeck Group, the Granatspitz Group, the Venediger Group, the Villgraten Mountains and the Rieserferner Group the Glockner Group forms the mountain range of the High Tauern.

Neighbouring ranges 
The Glockner Group borders on the following ranges in the Alps:

 Kitzbühel Alps (to the northwest)
 Salzburg Slate Alps (to the northeast)
 Goldberg Group (to the east)
 Schober Group (to the south)
 Granatspitze Group (to the west)

Peaks 
The named three-thousanders in the Glockner Group:

Großglockner, 
Kleinglockner, 
Glocknerwand, 
Teufelshorn, 
Großes Wiesbachhorn, 
Romariswandköpfe, 
Teufelskamp, 
Schneewinkelkopf, 
Johannisberg, 
Eiskögele, 
Klockerin, 
Hinterer Bratschenkopf, 
Vorderer Bratschenkopf, 
Großer Bärenkopf, 
Hoher Tenn, 
Mittlerer Bärenkopf, 
Hohe Dock, 
Hohe Riffl, 
Fuscherkarkopf, 
Schneespitze, 
Hohenwartkopf, 
Kleines Wiesbachhorn, 
Sinwelleck, 
Gramul, 
Vorderer Bärenkopf, 
Schwerteck, 
Kellerskopf, 
Luisenkopf, 
Hocheiser, 
Kitzsteinhorn, 
Hoher Kasten, 
Schattseitköpfl, 
Oberer Fochezkopf, 
Kleiner Tenn, 
Gamsspitze, 
Breitkopf, 
Totenkopf, 
Bauernbrachkopf, 
Schwarzköpfl, 
Zwingkopf, 
Freiwandkasten, 
Schwertkopf, 
Racherin, 
Lange Wand, 
Grieskogel, 
Blaue Köpfe, 
Freiwandspitz, 
Wasserradkopf, 
Kreuzwandspitze, 
Spielmann, 
Zollspitze, 
Brennkogel, 
Rifflkarkopf, 
Kellerswand, 
Kristallspitzl,

Tourism 
The region is well developed for tourism: The Großglockner High Alpine Road (and its branch to Franz Josefs Höhe), the road from Uttendorf to the Enzingerboden, the bus transfers to the reservoirs near Kaprun and the toll road from Kals am Großglockner to the Lucknerhaus enable cars and public transport to travel well into the mountains. A large number of Alpine huts offer accommodation for walkers and climbers:

 Glocknerhaus, 
 Hofmanns Hut, 
 Oberwalder Hut, 
 Salm Hut, 
 Schwarzenberg Hut, 
 Ebmatten-Fürthermoaralm, 
 Erzherzog Johann Hut, 
 Gleiwitzer Hut, 
 Glorer Hut, 
 Heinrich Schwaiger Haus, 
 Krefeld Hut, 
 Stüdl Hut, 
 Franz Josefs Haus, 
 Fuschertörlhaus, 
 Luckner Hut,

Power generation 
The power industry in Austrian and the Austrian Federal Railways use the water from the Glockner Group to generate electricity at the following locations Kaprun, Franz Josefs Höhe (Margaritze Reservoir) and Enzingerboden (Weißsee, Tauernmoossee).

Maps 
 German Alpine Club: Alpine Club Map No. 40 Glocknergruppe. 9th ed., Munich, 2006, .

References

Sources 
 Wolfgang Pusch: "Stau unterm Gipfelkreuz und Einsamkeit über den Wolken - alpine Möglichkeiten in der Glocknergruppe" in: Berg 2007 (Alpine Club Yearbook, Vol. 131) with Alpine Club map 40 of the Glocknergruppe, pp. 280–285.

External links

 
Mountain ranges of the Alps
Mountain ranges of Carinthia (state)
Mountain ranges of Salzburg (state)
Mountain ranges of Tyrol (state)